Muhamed Preljević (born 16 June 1964) is a Serbian-born Bosnian former footballer and now a coach. He started his career in Yugoslavia, playing for FK Bor and NK Dinamo Zagreb until moving to Germany during the Yugoslav Wars where he played for several teams in the 2nd Bundesliga.

Career

Born in Prijepolje, SR Serbia, Muhamed Preljević started his career in Yugoslavia where, after playing with FK Bor in the Second League, he joined NK Dinamo Zagreb in 1987 and played with them in the Yugoslav First League until 1991.

With the break-up of Yugoslavia he moves to Germany and joins Hallescher FC playing back then in the 2. Bundesliga.  He played in Germany until 2005 having represented Hertha 03 Zehlendorf, SpVgg Greuther Fürth, Viktoria Aschaffenburg, Viktoria Kahl and Sportfreunde Seligenstadt.

After retiring he became a coach.  He was assistant manager of the Bosnia and Herzegovina national football team between 2004 and 2006.

In summer 2006, he became the assistant manager of Viktoria Aschaffenburg, and between December 2006 and March 2007 he took the role of the main coach.

References

External sources
 
 Muhamed Preljevic playing and coaching career at kleeblatt-chronik.de

Living people
1964 births
Serbian expatriate footballers
Serbian footballers
Yugoslav footballers
Association football defenders
People from Prijepolje
Bosniaks of Serbia
FK Bor players
GNK Dinamo Zagreb players
Yugoslav First League players
Hallescher FC players
SpVgg Greuther Fürth players
Viktoria Aschaffenburg players
2. Bundesliga players
Expatriate footballers in Germany
Serbian expatriate sportspeople in Germany
Serbian football managers
Bosnia and Herzegovina football managers